Tulearus is a monotypic genus of crustaceans belonging to the monotypic family Tulearidae. The only species is Tulearus thomassini. The genus and species were first described in 1979 by Michel Ledoyer.

References

Amphipoda
Monotypic crustacean genera
Crustaceans described in 1979